is a railway station in the city of Utsunomiya, Tochigi, Japan, operated by the East Japan Railway Company (JR East).

Lines

Station layout
The station consists of one island platform, serving two tracks and connected to the station building by a footbridge. The station is staffed.

Platforms

History
Tsuruta Station opened on 2 September 1902. Togami Station was closed with the opening of Tsuruta. On 1 April 1987, the station came under the control of JR East with the privatization of the Japanese National Railways (JNR). A new station building was completed in March 2014.

Passenger statistics
In fiscal 2019, the station was used by an average of 1457 passengers daily (boarding passengers only).

Surrounding area
 Esojima Station, on the Tobu Utsunomiya Line
 Tsuruta Ekimae Post Office

See also
 List of railway stations in Japan

References

External links

 JR East station information 

Railway stations in Tochigi Prefecture
Nikkō Line
Stations of East Japan Railway Company
Railway stations in Japan opened in 1902
Utsunomiya